Waliam may be any of several languages on Salawati Island:
Moi language (Papuan)
Seget language (Papuan)
Salawati language (Papuan-influenced Austronesian)